Mike Sutton (born March 21, 1956) is a retired American college basketball coach and the former head men's basketball coach at Tennessee Technological University. He took over in 2002, after Jeff Lebo departed to lead the basketball program at the University of Tennessee at Chattanooga.

In April 2005, Sutton was diagnosed with Guillain–Barré syndrome, but he continued to coach, despite having to use a wheelchair.

On March 23, 2011, Sutton announced his retirement and Tennessee Tech promoted associate head coach Steve Payne to head coach.

References

1956 births
Living people
American men's basketball coaches
Basketball coaches from North Carolina
College men's basketball head coaches in the United States
East Carolina University alumni
Georgia Bulldogs basketball coaches
High school basketball coaches in the United States
Kentucky Wildcats men's basketball coaches
People from Farmville, North Carolina
People with Guillain–Barré syndrome
Tennessee Tech Golden Eagles men's basketball coaches
Tulsa Golden Hurricane men's basketball coaches
VCU Rams men's basketball coaches